The Qassar are a South Asian Muslim caste whose traditional occupation is washing clothes. They are considered to be Muslim converts from Hinduism, where the Dhobi castes are launderers. They are found in North India,East India as well as middle East India and Pakistan. The community is also known as Charhoa and Gazar in Pakistan and Qassar in India. They also use "Hawari" as a surname.

Present circumstances
The Qassar caste is known as Muslim Dhobi. In India, they continue to depend on their traditional occupation of washing clothes. The more enterprising elements within the group have set up dry cleaning businesses. At present time Qassar caste does not involve in washing clothes. They started their own business. Many in rural areas are tenant farmers. The community are distributed throughout North India and South India, with concentrations in Delhi, Gujarat, Uttar Pradesh and Bihar. Also in south Karnataka, Maharashtra, Andhra Pradesh they found. Although they live in multi-caste and multi-religious villages, they occupy distinct quarters in towns and villages. A Qassar settlement in often referred to as a Dhobighat. Each of their settlement contains a traditional caste council, which resolves disputes within the community, and deals with issues such as elopement, theft and adultery. Like other Muslim artisan castes, they have set caste associations old association is ''All India Jamiatul Qassar'' since 1980 and other one is ''All India Jamiatul Hawareen'' which acts as a pressure group for the community. They are largely Sunni Muslim, and are fairly orthodox, although a small minority in Haryana are Shia. In North India, the Qassar community are Urdu speaking, as well as speaking various local dialects such as Khari Boli and Awadhi.

In Delhi, they have two sub-divisions, the Shehri and Agharia. The Sheri trace their origin to Old Delhi, while the Agharia are originally from villages near Meerut and Hapur. They live in the localities of Farash Khana, Jama Masjid, Chitli Qabar, Lal Darwaza and Sheesh Mahal, all in Old Delhi. A large number of Delhi Qassar's emigrated to Pakistan, at the time of partition. After the independence of India, their traditional occupation has suffered. Traditionally, all clothes were delivered to the Qassar. This is no longer the case, and those Qassar still involved in their traditional are those who have started to pick work from hotels and hospitals.

In Haryana, the community is found throughout the state. They speak Haryanvi, with educated members of the community speaking Urdu. The community is split along sectarian lines, with there being both Sunni and Shia among the Qassar They are also further divided into clans, known as gotras, such as the Bhatti, Taga . The Qassar are strictly endogamous, and practice gotra exogamy. This practice is fairly common among the Haryana Muslims. Their main occupation remains the washing of clothes, although increasingly many Qassar are now agricultural Labourers. The community has informal caste councils at village level Like other Haryana Muslims, the community has been greatly reduced in numbers by migration to Pakistan at the time of the partition of India.

In Gujarat, the Qassar claim to have immigrated from Maharashtra, and settled throughout Gujarat. They speak Gujarati and Kutchi, and are Sunni Muslim. The Qassar are strictly endogamous and marry close kins. Like other Gujarati Muslims communities, they have their own caste association, the Dhobi Muslim Jamat. The Qassar are a landless community, with their traditional occupation remains washing and cleaning of clothes. A few successful Qassar have started their own businesses. The community are found mainly in Baroda, Ahmedabad, Banaskantha and Kaira districts.

Dilliwal Shaikh 

The Dilliwal Shaikh are a community of Qassar's, who are found in the cities of Lucknow, Kanpur and Varanasi in Uttar Pradesh. They are said to have migrated from Delhi some three centuries ago, and their name literally means someone from Delhi. In Lucknow, they are found mainly in the neighbourhoods of Nalbandi Tola, Aghameel Deon, Billojpura, Gopalganj and Wazirganj.  The Dilliwal are strictly endogamous, and do not intermarry with other Dhobi clans. They specialize in washing chikan cloth, a special type of fabric found in the Awadh region. Each of their settlement contains a caste council, that maintains social control, and resolves any intra community dispute. The Dilliwal speak Awadhi, and follow the Sunni sect of Islam.

In Pakistan
In Pakistan, the Punjab Qassar are mainly a rural community. The Qassar are an artisan caste, receiving a fixed share of the agricultural produce for their services. The Gazar sub-division, found in southern Punjab, have taken to agriculture. The Gazar and Charhoa are Seraiki speaking, while the Qassar in central Punjab speak Punjabi.

See also

 Salmani
 Malik
 Momin Ansari

References

Social groups of Pakistan
Social groups of Uttar Pradesh
Indian castes
Shaikh clans
Muslim communities of India
Punjabi tribes
Saraiki tribes
Social groups of Punjab, Pakistan
Muslim communities of Uttar Pradesh
Social groups of Haryana
Muslim communities of Gujarat
Laundry occupations